Jean Bungartz (6 May 1854 – 15 September 1934) was a German animal painter, author and book illustrator.

Bungartz founded the Hamburger Verein zur Förderung reiner Hunderassen, the Hamburg society for the promotion of pure-bred dogs, in the 1880s. In 1893 he founded the Deutschen Verein für Sanitätshunde, the German association for Red Cross dogs, and led it until 1909.

Publications 

His published works include:
 Kynos: Handbuch zur Beurtheilung der Racen-Reinheit des Hundes: fünfunddressig Tafeln mit 70 Abbildungen. Stuttgart: Neff, 1884.
 Hühnerracen, illustriertes Handbuch zur Beurtheilung der Racen des Haushuhnes. Leipzig: E. Twietmeyer, 1885.
 Geflügel-Album (Abth. 1, Hühner). Lechenich: Ferd. Bungartz, 1885.
 Pflege und Zucht der Zwergpapageien und Sittiche. Lechenich: Ferd. Bungartz, 1885.
 Taubenracen: illustrietes handbuch zur Beurtheilung der Racen unserer Haustauben; enthaltend die bis jetzt bekannten Farben-, Racen- und verschiedenen ausländischen Luxustauben. Leipzig: Twietmeyer, 1885. 
 Wasser- und Ziergeflügel: ill. Handbuch zur Beurtheilung d. Raren u. Schläge unseres Wasser- u. Ziergeflügels; nebst kurzen Angaben über Haltung, Pflege, Fütterung u. Aufzucht; Anl. zur Errichtung e. kleinen Ententeiches u. e. Fasanenvolière. Leipzig: Twietmeyer, 1886.
 Die jagdbaren Thiere Europas und die zur Jagd gebräuchlichen Hunderacen. Stuttgart: P. Neff, 1886.
 Deutscher Hundesport: vollständige Anleitung über Baulichkeiten, Einrichtungen etc; nebst den zum Rennen geeignesten Hunderacen. Minden: E. Schlegel, 1886.
 Modell-Brieftauben-Album: Aquarellen gemalt v. Jean Bungartz. Mit e. Vorw. v. J. Hörter. 10 Taf. in Farbendruck. Leipzig: Twietmeyer, 1888.
 Kaninchen-Racen. Illustrirtes Handbuch zur Beurtheilung der Kaninchen-Racen, enthaltend die Racen der Kaninchen, deren Behandlung, Zucht, Verwerthung, Krankheiten. Magdeburg: Creutz'sche Verlagsbuchhandlung, [1888].
 Der Kriegshund und seine Dressur: enthaltend das Ganze des Kriegshundwesens. Leipzig: Twietmeyer, 1892.
 Der Hund im Dienste des rothen Kreuzes: seine Verwendung, Rasse, Dressur, Pflege und Fütterung. Leipzig: Twietmeyer, 1892.
 Illustriertes Katzenbuch. Berlin: Paul Parey, 1896.
 Die Ziege, Ihre Haltung, Pflege, Fütterung, Zucht usw.. Berlin: August Scherl, 1918.
 Das Schaf, seine Rassen, Zucht, Haltung, Fütterung usw.. Berlin: August Scherl, 1920.

 References 

 Further reading 

 Helmut Weingarten (1998). Vor 100 Jahren starb Jean Bungartz (in German). In: Jahrbuch der Stadt Erftstadt. [s.l.]: Stadt Erftstadt. .
 Frank Bartsch, Hanna Stommel: (2004). Lechenich: von der Römerzeit bis heute: eine illustrierte Stadtgeschichte (in German). Erftstadt: Pier. .
 Julia Fabienne Klan (2009). Der "Deutsche Verein für Sanitätshunde" und das Sanitätshundewesen in Deutschland (1893-1946) (in German). Giessen: VVB Laufersweiler. .
 Bernhard Pickert (2012). Unvergessenes Multitalent auf dem Gebiet der Tierwelt: Jean Bungartz, ein „Ritter pp.“ (in German). Kaninchenzeitung'' 2012 (13): 16–18.

1854 births
1934 deaths
19th-century German male artists
19th-century German male writers
19th-century German writers
19th-century German painters
20th-century German painters
20th-century German male artists
Agricultural writers
Animal artists
German illustrators
German male painters
Natural history illustrators